Maria Bergkvist (born 12 August 1977) is a Swedish football coach and former player who was the manager of Damallsvenskan club Umeå IK. In her playing career she was a defender for Umeå and the Sweden national team.

Club career 

While playing for Umeå between 1999 and 2007 Bergkvist won six Damallsvenskan titles and two UEFA Women's Cups (now known as UEFA Women's Champions League). She returned to the club as an assistant coach in 2009. After five years as an assistant, Bergkvist took the head coach job for Umeå's 2015 campaign.

International career 

Bergkvist won her first cap for Sweden aged 28, starting a 1–1 draw with England in Cyprus on 9 February 2006. She made a total of seven national team appearances, all in 2006.

References

External links 

 
 Umeå IK profile 

Living people
1977 births
Swedish women's footballers
Sweden women's international footballers
Damallsvenskan players
Swedish women's football managers
Umeå IK players
Women's association football defenders